Fort Grahame Water Aerodrome  was located adjacent to Fort Grahame, British Columbia, Canada.

See also
Fort Grahame Airport

References

Defunct seaplane bases in British Columbia